Xiang Jiachi (born 10 January 1993) is a Chinese footballer.

Club career
Xiang Jiachi started his professional football career in 2011 when he was promoted to Dongguan Nancheng's squad for the 2011 China League Two campaign. He scored his first senior goal on 9 July 2011, in a 1–0 victory against Hubei CTGU Kangtian. Xiang transferred to Chinese Super League side Guangzhou R&F in 2013. After playing in the reserve league for three years, he was promoted to Guangzhou R&F's first team squad by Dragan Stojković in 2016. In August 2016, he was loaned to Hong Kong Premier League side R&F, which was the satellite team of Guangzhou R&F. On 24 September 2016, he made his debut for R&F in a 2–0 away defeat against BC Glory Sky, coming on as a substitute for Wei Zongren in the 61st minute. He scored his first goal for the club on 30 September 2016, in a 2–1 away win against Hong Kong Pegasus.

Career statistics 
.

References

External links
 

1993 births
Living people
Chinese footballers
Footballers from Wuhan
Guangzhou City F.C. players
R&F (Hong Kong) players
Xinjiang Tianshan Leopard F.C. players
China League One players
China League Two players
Association football midfielders
Hong Kong Premier League players
21st-century Chinese people